Michael Jackson's Thriller is a 1983 music video for the song "Thriller" by the American singer Michael Jackson, released on December 2, 1983. The video was directed by John Landis, written by Landis and Jackson, and stars Jackson and Ola Ray. It references numerous horror films and sees Jackson dancing with a horde of zombies.

Jackson's sixth album, Thriller, was released in November 1982 and spent months at the top of the Billboard 200, backed by successful videos for the singles "Billie Jean" and "Beat It". In July 1983, after Thriller was displaced from the top of the chart, Jackson's manager Frank DiLeo suggested making a music video for "Thriller". Jackson hired Landis after seeing his 1981 film An American Werewolf in London. The pair conceived a short film with a budget much larger than previous music videos. It was filmed at various locations in Los Angeles, including the Palace Theater. A making-of documentary, Making Michael Jackson's Thriller, was produced to sell to television networks.

Michael Jackson's Thriller was launched to great anticipation and played regularly on MTV. It doubled sales of Thriller, helping it become the best-selling album in history, and the documentary sold over a million copies, becoming the best-selling videotape at the time. It is credited for transforming music videos into a serious art form, breaking down racial barriers in popular entertainment and popularizing the making-of documentary format. The success transformed Jackson into a dominant force in global pop culture.

Many elements of Michael Jackson's Thriller have had a lasting impact on popular culture, such as the zombie dance and Jackson's red jacket, designed by Landis's wife Deborah Nadoolman. Fans worldwide re-enact its zombie dance and it remains popular on YouTube. The Library of Congress described it as the most famous music video of all time, and it has been named the greatest video by various publications and readers' polls. In 2009, it became the first music video inducted into the United States National Film Registry by the Library of Congress as "culturally, historically or aesthetically significant".

Plot 

In the 1950s, Michael Jackson and a young woman (Ola Ray) run out of gas while driving in a wooded area. They walk into the forest, and Jackson asks her to be his girlfriend; she accepts. He warns her that he is "not like other guys", transforms into a werecat and attacks her.

In the present, Jackson and his girlfriend are watching the werecat film in a theater. The girlfriend leaves, scared by the film. Walking down a city street at night, Jackson teases her by performing the verses of "Thriller". They pass a graveyard, where zombies rise from their graves and surround them in the street. Jackson becomes a zombie himself and dances with the horde to the song. He changes back into a human to sing the choruses.

Jackson and the zombies chase his girlfriend into an abandoned house. She screams and wakes up, realizing it was a nightmare. Jackson embraces her, but turns to the camera and grins, revealing his werecat eyes.

Horror elements
The Thriller video makes many allusions to horror films. The opening scene parodies 1950s B-movies, with Jackson and Ray dressed as 1950s teenagers. The metamorphosis of the polite "boy next door" into a werecat has been interpreted as a depiction of male sexuality, depicted as naturally bestial, predatory, and aggressive. The critic Kobena Mercer found similarities to the werewolf in The Company of Wolves (1984).

The zombie dance sequence corresponds the lyric about a masquerade ball of the dead. Jackson's make-up casts "a ghostly pallor" over his skin and emphasizes the outline of his skull, an allusion to the mask from The Phantom of the Opera (1925). According to Peter Dendle, the zombie invasion sequence was inspired by Night of the Living Dead (1968). Dendle wrote that the video captures the feelings of claustrophobia and helplessness essential to zombie films.

Development

Michael Jackson's album Thriller was released in November 1982 on Epic Records and spent months at the top of the Billboard 200. It was backed by successful music videos for the singles "Billie Jean" and "Beat It", which are credited for raising creative standards for music videos and demonstrating their promotional power.

In June 1983, Thriller was displaced from the top of the Billboard 200 chart by the Flashdance soundtrack. It briefly regained the position in July, before being displaced by Synchronicity by the Police. Jackson urged the Epic executives Walter Yetnikoff and Larry Stessel to help conceive a plan to return the album to the top of the charts.

The horror-themed "Thriller" had not been planned for release as a single. Epic saw it as a novelty song; Yetnikoff asked, "Who wants a single about monsters?" Jackson's manager Frank DiLeo suggested making a music video for it, and recalled telling Jackson: "It's simple—all you've got to do is dance, sing, and make it scary." According to Vanity Fair, Jackson preferred "benign Disney-esque fantasies where people were nice and children were safe", which ensured the video would be "creepy-comical, not genuinely terrifying".

In early August, after seeing his horror film An American Werewolf in London (1981), Jackson contacted the director John Landis. At the time, commercial directors did not direct music videos, but Landis was intrigued. He wanted to make a theatrical short rather than a standard music video, and hoped to use Jackson's celebrity to return theatrical shorts to popularity. Landis and Jackson conceived a short film shot on 35mm film with the production values of a feature film, with a budget of $900,000, much larger than any previous music video.

Funding 
According to Landis, when he called Yetnikoff to propose the film, he swore so loudly he had to remove the phone from his ear. Epic had little interest in making another video for Thriller, believing that the album had peaked, and eventually agreed to contribute only $100,000.

Initially, the television networks refused to finance the project, sharing the view that Thriller was "last year's news". MTV, which had found success with Jackson's earlier videos, had a policy of not financing music videos, instead expecting record companies to pay for them. However, after the new channel Showtime agreed to pay half the budget, MTV agreed to pay the rest, justifying the expenditure as financing for a motion picture and not a music video.

To help finance the production, Landis's producer George Folsey Jr. suggested a making-of documentary that, combined with the "Thriller" video, would produce an hour-long film that could be sold to television. The documentary, Making Michael Jackson's Thriller, was directed by Jerry Kramer. It includes home video footage of a young Jackson dancing and footage of his performances from The Ed Sullivan Show and Motown 25: Yesterday, Today, Forever. MTV paid $250,000 for the exclusive rights to show the documentary; Showtime paid $300,000 for pay-cable rights. Jackson covered additional costs, for which he would be reimbursed. Vestron Music Video offered to distribute Making Michael Jackson's Thriller on VHS and Betamax; this was a pioneering concept, as most video cassettes at the time were sold to rental stores rather than directly to viewers. Vestron paid an additional $500,000 to market the cassettes.

Production

Makeup and wardrobe 
Jackson wanted to make a video in which he transformed into a four-legged beast, similarly to the transformation scene in An American Werewolf in London. This idea was replaced with a two-legged monster, as this made it easier for him to dance. Landis felt Jackson should become scary and creepy, but not ugly. He suggested that Jackson should become a werewolf in a 1950s setting, inspired by the 1957 film I Was a Teenage Werewolf. Makeup artist Rick Baker decided to turn Jackson into a werecat "because I just didn't want to do another werewolf". He initially imagined the werecat would resemble a black panther, but added a longer mane and larger ears. According to Landis, the production involved the largest makeup team in film history up to that point, with 40 makeup artists.

Landis's wife Deborah Nadoolman, who had recently worked on the film Raiders of the Lost Ark (1981), designed the costumes, including Jackson's red jacket. She dressed Jackson in "hip", casual clothes that would be comfortable to dance in, and red to contrast with the night setting and dark palette; she used the same color for Jackson's jeans to make him appear taller.

Choreography 
Jackson created the zombie dance with the choreographer Michael Peters, who had choreographed the "Beat It" video. Jackson said his first concern was to create a zombie dance that did not seem comical. He and Peters imagined how the zombies would move by making faces in the mirror, incorporating "jazzy" moves, "not too much ballet or whatever".

Casting 
Landis said directing Jackson was "like dealing with a gifted 10-year-old". He described Jackson as "emotionally damaged ... He was tortured, but he was happy-go-lucky for a lot of it. He worked very hard. He really was childlike."

Thriller was the first time Jackson had interacted with a woman in a video, which Landis described as a "breakthrough". Jennifer Beals turned down an offer to play Jackson's girlfriend. According to Landis, Ola Ray, a former Playboy Playmate, was cast as she was "crazy for Michael" and had a "great smile". Landis encouraged Jackson and Ray to improvise during their scenes, and urged Jackson to act "sexy" and "show virility" for his female fans. According to Ray, the chemistry between them was real and they shared "intimate moments" during the shoot.

Filming 

Thriller was filmed at the Palace Theatre in downtown Los Angeles, the zombie sequence at the junction of Union Pacific Avenue and South Calzona Street in East Los Angeles, and the final house scene at 1345 Carroll Avenue in the Angeleno Heights neighborhood of Echo Park. The director of photography was Robert Paynter, who had worked with Landis on Trading Places. Entertainment figures including Marlon Brando, Fred Astaire, Rock Hudson and Jackie Kennedy Onassis visited the set. Jackson's parents Joseph and Katherine Jackson also visited. According to Landis, Michael asked Joseph to be removed; he refused and had to be escorted off the set by police. Joseph denied this.

Jehovah's Witnesses dispute 
Weeks before the premiere, Jackson, then a Jehovah's Witness, was told by the organization leaders that the film promoted demonology and that he would be excommunicated. Jackson called his assistant, John Branca, and ordered him to destroy the negatives.  The production team agreed to protect the negatives and locked them in Branca's office. Branca mollified Jackson by suggesting they include a disclaimer at the start of the film stating that it did not reflect Jackson's personal convictions. In a statement published in Awake!, a magazine published by the Watch Tower Bible and Tract Society of Pennsylvania, Jackson said: "I just intended to do a good, fun short film, not to purposely bring to the screen something to scare people or to do anything bad. I want to do what's right. I would never do anything like that again." He said he had blocked further distribution and promotion of the film where he had been able.

Release 
On November 14, 1983, Thriller was shown to a private audience at the Crest Theater in Los Angeles. In attendance were celebrities including Diana Ross, Warren Beatty, Prince, and Eddie Murphy. Jackson stayed in the projection booth, declining Ray's invitation to join the audience. The audience gave the film a standing ovation. At Murphy's insistence, the film was played again.

The video debuted on MTV alongside Making Michael Jackson's Thriller on December 2, 1983. After each broadcast, MTV advertised when they would next play it, and recorded audience figures ten times the norm. Showtime aired the video six times in February. Within months, the documentary sold a million copies, making it the bestselling video release at that point. As films required theatrical screenings to be eligible for Academy Awards, Landis had the video played before screenings of Fantasia (1940) at a Los Angeles cinema, though it was not nominated.

The video doubled boosted sales of the Thriller album, which sold a million copies a week following the video debut and became the bestselling album of all time. At the 1984 MTV Video Music Awards, Thriller won the awards for Viewers Choice, Best Overall Performance and Best Choreography, and was nominated for Best Concept Video, Best Male Video and Video of the Year. The success transformed Jackson into a dominant force in global pop culture, and cemented his status as the "king of pop". According to Landis, the response was "a surprise to everyone but Michael".

In 1984, the National Coalition on Television Violence (NCTV) reviewed 200 MTV videos and classified more than half as too violent, including Thriller. NCTV chairman Thomas Radecki said: "It's not hard to imagine young viewers after seeing Thriller saying, 'Gee, if Michael Jackson can terrorize his girlfriend, why can't I do it too?'"

Legacy

The Thriller video sealed MTV's position as a major cultural force, helped disassemble racial barriers for black artists, revolutionized music video production, popularized making-of documentaries, and drove rentals and sales of VHS tapes. The music video director Brian Grant credited Thriller as the turning point when music videos became a "proper industry". Nina Blackwood, a former MTV executive, said music videos improved after Thriller, with more storylines and more intricate choreography. She said: "You look at those early videos and they were shockingly bad."

Vinny Marino of ABC News said that the video's selection as the "Greatest Video of All Time" was a "no-brainer", and that it "continues to be considered the greatest video ever by just about everyone". Gil Kaufman of MTV described the video as "iconic" and felt that it was one of Jackson's most enduring legacies. He said it was the "mini-movie that revolutionized music videos" and "cemented Jackson's status as one of the most ambitious, innovative pop stars of all time".

Michael Jackson's Thriller was named the "greatest video" by MTV in 1999, and by VH1 and Time in 2001. In a poll of over one thousand users conducted by Myspace in 2010, it was voted the most influential music video. In 2009, it became the first music video to be selected for the National Film Registry by the Library of Congress. The Library described it as "the most famous music video of all time". The National Film Preservation Board coordinator, Steve Legett, said the video had been considered for induction for years, but was chosen mainly due to Jackson's death that year.

Jackson's red leather jacket became a fashion icon and has been widely emulated. In 2011, one of the two jackets worn by Jackson in the video sold at auction for $1.8 million. "Thriller" has become closely associated with Halloween; in 2016, US president Barack Obama and first lady Michelle Obama danced to the song with schoolchildren at a White House Halloween event.

In 2017, the video made its debut in a newly restored 3D version at the 74th annual Venice Film Festival, accompanied by the Making of Michael Jackson's Thriller documentary, also newly remastered. It was also screened at the Toronto International Film Festival, followed by a US premiere at the Grauman's Chinese Theatre. It was remastered in IMAX 3D for a limited engagement in 2018, preceding screenings of The House With a Clock in Its Walls in North America for its first week.

A Hollywood production company attempted to turn Jackson's song "Billie Jean", which is also featured on Jackson's Thriller album, into a feature film, but no plans were completed. In 2009, Jackson sold the Thriller rights to the Nederlander Organization to stage a Broadway musical based on the video.

The video game Plants vs. Zombies by PopCap Games contained a reference to the Thriller music video in its original releases from May 2009 (a month before Jackson's death) until it was removed in July 2010. The "Dancing Zombie" enemy was originally resembled Jackson dressed in his Thriller outfit and the "Backup Dancer Zombies" that surrounded the Dancing Zombie resembled the backup dancers from the part of Thriller where Jackson turns onto a zombie. The description of the Dancing Zombie in the game paraphrased the disclaimer at the end of Thriller. In 2010, Jackson's estate objected to the Jackson zombie in the game. PopCap agreed to remove the Thriller zombies and replace them with generic disco-dancing zombies. The changes applied starting with the Game of the Year edition and all future releases since.

The Thriller dance is performed in major cities around the world; the largest zombie dance included 12,937 dancers, in Mexico City. Thriller is popular on YouTube, which hosts user-submitted videos of reenactments of the dance. A YouTube video of more than 1,500 prisoners performing the dance attracted 14 million views by 2010.

Litigation
In 2009, Landis sued Jackson in a dispute over royalties for the video, saying Jackson had failed to pay him 50% of the proceeds. The lawsuit was settled in 2012 for an undisclosed amount. In 2013, Landis said: "My deal was with Michael's company and Michael's company was mismanaged ... I was suing him for 14 years."

Ola Ray also complained of problems collecting royalties. At first, she blamed Jackson, but apologized to him in 1997. However, Ray sued Jackson on May 6, 2009, less than two months before his death on June 25. In 2013, she settled with the Jackson estate for $75,000.

Accolades

Grammy Award

MTV Video Music Award

See also
List of most expensive music videos
 Thriller viral video featuring the CPDRC Dancing Inmates of Cebu Provincial Detention and Rehabilitation Center, Cebu, in the Cebu Province of the Philippines
 Donga, the "Indian Thriller" internet meme
 Thrill the World
 Michael Jackson's Ghosts

References

Sources

External links
 
 
 

1983 films
1983 horror films
1980s musical films
1983 short films
African-American horror films
Films about shapeshifting
Films produced by Michael Jackson
Films directed by John Landis
Films produced by John Landis
Films produced by George Folsey Jr.
Films set in the 1950s
Films set in the 1980s
Films shot in Los Angeles
Music videos directed by John Landis
Films with screenplays by John Landis
Films with screenplays by Michael Jackson
United States National Film Registry films
Religious controversies in film
American haunted house films
American zombie films
American monster movies
1980s music videos
1980s English-language films
1980s American films